Muḥammad ibn ʿAlī Bā ʿAlawī commonly known as al-Faqīh al-Muqaddam, ; 574 H - 653 H or 1178 CE - 1232 CE) is known as the founder of Ba 'Alawiyya Sufi order which has influenced Sufism in Yemen, Pakistan, India and Southeast Asia. He is the only son of Ali son of Muhammad Sahib al-Mirbath whom all 75 families of Ba 'Alawi sada that spread out from Yemen to Southeast Asia are rooted.

Epithet
The Title al-Faqih was given because he was a great teacher who mastered a lot of religious sciences, including the science of jurisprudence. One of his teachers, Ali Bamarwan said that he mastered the science of jurisprudence as great as the former scholar Muhammad ibn al-Hasan ibn al-Shafi'i Furak who died in 406 H.

While the title al-Muqaddam means he is the foremost. In this case, Muhammad ibn Ali throughout  his life was always given precedence.  His grave located in Zanbal  in Hadhramaut is frequently visited by Muslims often before they visit other religious sites in Yemen. It can also means somebody who has been authorized by his murshid to assist in teaching the path to other students (see Muqaddam).

Life
Muhammad was born in Tarim. His patrilineal lineage is 
 Muhammad 
 Ali
 Muhammad Sahib al-Mirbat
 Ali Khali Qasam
 Alawi al-Thani
 Muhammad Sahib al-Sawma'ah
 Alawi al-Awwal
 Ubayd Allah
 Ahmad al-Muhajir
 Isa al-Rumi
 Muhammad al-Naqib
 Ali al-Uraydi
 Imam Ja'far al-Sadiq 
 Imam Muhammad al-Baqir 
 Imam Zayn al-Abidin
 Imam Husayn
 Imam Ali ibn Abi Talib

Muhammad grew up in an environment of knowledge and righteousness, memorizing the Qur'an and mastering the sciences of the Sacred Law in his youth.  He studied until became a Mujtahid.  He taught and fasted in the daytime, while in the night he spent his nights in one of the caves being busy in meditation in Nu'ayr Valley outside Tarim.

Teachings
Muhammad was the founder of Ba 'Alawiyya tariqa (Sufi order) and the first who introduce Sufism in Yemen.  He received his Ijazah from Abu Madyan through one of his prominent students, Abd al-Rahman bin Ahmad al-Hadhrami al-Maghribi (he died before reaching Hadramaut, but it was continued by another Moroccan Sufi he met in Mecca).  However, Muhammad al-Faqih did not follow fully Abu Madyan's tariqa, but he combined it with the teachings of his forefathers and the tariqa of Abdul Qadir Gilani.

During his time, Sayyid families in Hadramaut were seen as a threat by other tribes. Due to instability in the region, it was normal during his study that Muhammad bin Ali put a sword on his lap for protection. Muhammad grew tired of the tension and bloodshed in the ranks of the believers thus symbolically broke his sword and announced that his Tariqa and the way of Alawiyyin Sayyids are non-violence and renounced any tariqa that uses violence.
It is believed the dissemination of Islam in Southeast Asia was carried out by Sufi traders and clerics of Hadramaut (followers and descendants of Muhammad al-Faqih Muqaddam) who transited in India since 15th century as the Sufism and its influences can be traced strongly in the region.

Among the followers of his teachings and also his descendants that are prominent before 20th century are Imam Abd Allah ibn Alawi al-Haddad and Sayyid Abu Bakr al-Aydarus. and in modern time are Habib Umar bin Hafiz and Habib Ali al-Jifri, among others. Another follower in modern time who is not directly descendants of him is Sayyid Muhammad ibn 'Alawi al-Maliki.

References

Bibliography
 
 
 
 

Shafi'is
Sunni Sufis
Sunni imams
Sunni Muslim scholars of Islam
Founders of Sufi orders
History of Yemen
Hadhrami people
Yemeni Sufis
Yemeni Sufi religious leaders
Yemeni Sufi saints
13th-century Arabs
1178 births
1255 deaths